Our Thickness is the third album by The Russian Futurists.

Track listing 
All songs were written by Matthew Adam Hart.
 "Paul Simon"
 "Sentiments vs. Syllables"
 "Our Pen's Out of Ink"
 "Still Life"
 "Hurtin' 4 Certain"
 "Why You Gotta Do That Thang?"
 "It's Over, It's Nothing"
 "Incandescent Hearts"
 "These Seven Notes"
 "2 Dots on a Map"

2005 albums
The Russian Futurists albums
Upper Class Recordings albums